The 2014 President's Cup is the 64th season of the President's Cup, a knock-out competition for Maldives' top 4 football clubs. New Radiant Sports Club are the defending champions, having beaten Maziya in last season's final in extra time.

The final was held on 30 November 2014, in which New Radiant won 1-0 on extra time from a long range shot from Ali Fasir claiming a record eleventh President's Cup and winning the title for the third time in a row.

Background

Broadcasting rights
The broadcasting rights for all the matches of 2013 Maldives President's Cup were given to the Television Maldives.

Qualifier
Top 4 teams after the end of 2014 Dhivehi League third round will be qualified for the President's Cup.

Final qualifier

Semi-final qualifier

Semi-final

Final

Statistics

Scorers

Assists

References

President's Cup (Maldives)
Pres